This is a list of notable people from Saint John County, New Brunswick. Although not everyone in this list was born in Saint John County, they all live or have lived in Saint John County and have had significant connections to the communities.

This article does not include People from Saint John as they have their own section.

See also
List of people from New Brunswick

References

Saint John